"Hey Mr. Dream Maker" (in some releases as "Hey Mr. Dreammaker") is a song by Cliff Richard from his album Every Face Tells a Story and the first single to be released from the album. It was released as a single in 1976 reaching number 31 on the UK Singles Chart. It was a top ten hit in South Africa reaching number 6.

Track listing
7": EMI / EMI 2499
 "Hey Mr. Dream Maker" – 4:48
 "No One Waits" – 3:41

Personnel
Cliff Richard – vocals  
Terry Britten – guitar
Alan Tarney – bass
Brian Bennett – drums, percussion
Graham Todd – keyboards
Frank Ricotti – percussion
Tony Rivers – backing vocals, vocal arrangement
John Perry – backing vocals

Chart performance

Covers
The song was covered by Olivia Newton-John in her album Don't Stop Believin' (album) released on 30 October 1976 being her first album to be recorded in Nashville.

References

Cliff Richard songs
1976 singles
1976 songs
Songs written by Alan Tarney
Songs written by Bruce Welch
EMI Records singles